Stone Barn may refer to:

James Allen Stone Barn, southeast of Earlham, Iowa
Stone Barn (Guttenberg, Iowa)
C.D. Bevington House and Stone Barn, Winterset, Iowa
Stone Barn Farm, Mount Desert Island, Maine
J. C. Adams Stone Barn, northeast of Sun River, Montana
Stone Barns Center for Food & Agriculture, Pocantico Hills, New York
Daniel E. Krause Stone Barn, Chase, Wisconsin